Jody Dickinson is an American politician and a Democratic former member of the Arkansas House of Representatives representing District 47 from 2013 to 2015. Dickinson served consecutively from January 2009 until January 2013 in the District 58 seat, where she had succeeded her husband, Representative Tommy Dickinson. Dickinson is registered to vote as a Republican.

Education
Dickinson earned her bachelor's degree from the University of Arkansas at Monticello.

Elections
2012 Redistricted to District 47, with Representative Stephen Meeks redistricted to District 67, Dickinson was challenged in the May 22, 2012 Democratic primary, which she won with 1,614 votes (57.1%), and was unopposed for the November 6, 2012 general election.
2008 Initially in District 58, when Tommy Dickinson left the Legislature and left the seat open, Dickinson placed first in the four-way May 20, 2008 Democratic Primary with 1,026 votes, won the June 10 runoff election with 1,432 votes (52.1%), and was unopposed for the November 4, 2008 General election.
2010 Dickinson was unopposed for both the May 18, 2010 Democratic primary and the November 2, 2010 general election.

References

External links
 voting records
Official page at the Arkansas House of Representatives

Jody Dickinson at Ballotpedia
Jody Dickinson at the National Institute on Money in State Politics

Place of birth missing (living people)
Year of birth missing (living people)
Living people
Democratic Party members of the Arkansas House of Representatives
People from Newport, Arkansas
University of Arkansas at Monticello alumni
Women state legislators in Arkansas
21st-century American women